Buchwara is an area in Dalgate locality in Srinagar in the Indian union territory of Jammu and Kashmir. It is located underneath the hill of Shankaracharya. The population of Buchwara is more than 5000 people currently but before 50 years, the population was of only a few people.

History
Almost a hundred years ago, Buchwara was nearly a jungle. Then a businessman from sarafkadal area belonging to "Suhaff" family purchased the land from the Maharaja. He invested the land in orchids, cultivated the nuts, walnuts, apples, and more vegetation. Then Buchwara became more of a livable habitat than the jungle it was before. The water of Dal Lake was so vast that it reached the Buchwara masjid, so the people settled on the upper areas of Buchwara.
The heir of this family still lives in Buchwara and her honorable name is Ibtism Suhaff.

References 

Villages in Srinagar district